This is a list of Hindu ( Sanatana ) temples in Tulu Nadu, a region in the southern Indian state of Karnataka, comprising present day Dakshina Kannada, Udupi district of Karnataka state and Kasargod district of Kerala state . Tulu Nadu is famous for numerous temples dedicated to Ganapati, Subrahmanya, Vishnu, Shiva, Durga, Lakshmi, Guru and hundreds of temples of other deities.

References

Hindu temples in Dakshina Kannada district
Tulu Nadu
Hindu temples in Udupi district
Tulu Nadu
Temples in Tulu Nadu